Fabrizio Nassi (5 August 1951 – 16 November 2019) was an Italian volleyball player. He was part of Italian teams that finished second at the 1978 World Championships, eighth at the 1976 Summer Olympics and ninth at the 1980 Summer Olympics.

References

1951 births
2019 deaths
Olympic volleyball players of Italy
Volleyball players at the 1976 Summer Olympics
Volleyball players at the 1980 Summer Olympics
Italian men's volleyball players